The 1994 Monmouth Hawks football team represented Monmouth University in the 1994 NCAA Division I-AA football season as an independent. This year was the team's first season as an NCAA Division I-AA independent program. The Hawks were led by second-year head coach Kevin Callahan and played their home games at Kessler Field. They finished the season with a record of 7–2.

Schedule

References

Monmouth
Monmouth Hawks football seasons
Monmouth Hawks football